Émile Dubois (1913–1973) was a French politician. He served as a member of the National Assembly from 1951 to 1955, representing Nord.

References

1913 births
1973 deaths
Politicians from Lille
French Section of the Workers' International politicians
Deputies of the 2nd National Assembly of the French Fourth Republic
Senators of Nord (French department)